Campaign Legal Center (CLC) is a nonprofit 501(c)(3) government watchdog group in the United States. CLC supports strong enforcement of United States campaign finance laws. Trevor Potter, former Republican chairman of the Federal Election Commission, is CLC's founding president.

Activities
In 2004, it was a party to complaints filed with the Federal Election Commission against groups like the Swift Boat Veterans for Truth and America Coming Together, for trying to directly influence federal elections.

In 2006, CLC testified before Congress in support of reauthorizing the Voting Rights Act (VRA).

CLC was critical of former vice-presidential candidate John Edwards's use of charity organizations which he had founded, complaining they were being used chiefly to keep himself in the public eye in preparation for a possible 2008 presidential run.

The group filed an amicus brief in the 2007 landmark Supreme Court case Citizens United v. Federal Election Commission, unsuccessfully urging the Court not to strike down a provision of McCain-Feingold which prevented unlimited political contributions to organizations not directly affiliated with Federal candidates. The following year it again filed a brief with the Court over a rule in the 2002 Bipartisan Campaign Reform Act that raised contribution limits when candidates faced a self-funding opponent; the group favored the rule, which was struck down by the Court.

In 2010, CLC joined with another watchdog group, Democracy 21, in asking the Internal Revenue Service to investigate a tax exempt social welfare group run by Karl Rove.
 
The group filed an amicus brief in 2011 on behalf of eight public interest groups in support of challenged provisions of Arizona's clean election law, the Citizens Clean Elections Act. After the Court struck down the provisions, a spokesperson for the group declared that the decision undermines "the integrity of our elections." Later that year, CLC highlighted concerns before the FEC that Stephen Colbert's satirical Super PAC, Americans for a Better Tomorrow, Tomorrow, had serious imitators exploiting the regulations on politicians with television contracts. The organization's President, Trevor Potter, served as Colbert's lawyer in establishing the PAC. In August, it asked the U.S. Justice Department to probe the behavior of W Spann LLC.

The group advocated for more legal restrictions on campaign giving and lobbying during the 2012 presidential primaries.

CLC attorneys represented Wisconsin voters in the 2017 Supreme Court case Gill v. Whitford. CLC’s Paul Smith argued the case before the Court on October 3, 2017.

In 2018, CLC launched a website for citizens with felony convictions to explain their voting rights in all 50 states. That same year, CLC filed several complaints with the FEC alleging illegal coordination between the Trump campaign and the National Rifle Association. CLC’s Potter also appeared on Face the Nation and 60 Minutes in 2018 to discuss President Trump’s potential campaign finance violations related to the hush money paid by Michael Cohen to Stormy Daniels. Prior to the 2018 election, CLC attorneys represented Native American voters in a case challenging North Dakota’s voter ID law.

During the 2020 elections, CLC worked on voting issues in states across the U.S. amid the COVID-19 pandemic. It sued the states of Pennsylvania, New York, New Jersey, Rhode Island, and North Dakota over signature match rules that prevented voters with disabilities, racial minority voters, and voters who were non-Native English speakers from having their votes count at disproportionately high rates. Campaign Legal Center is a partner of VoteRiders.

In late July 2020, CLC filed an 81-page complaint with the FEC against the Trump re-election campaign, alleging that it used pass-through entities to conceal almost $170 million of campaign spending from the FEC.

In 2021, CLC sued the Federal Election Commission (FEC) for refusing to launch an investigation into Donald Trump's presidential campaign over allegations that it coordinated with a super PAC. CLC also filed a complaint with the FEC over the manner in which Ted Cruz's staff promoted his book One Vote Away: How a Single Supreme Court Vote Can Change History.

CLC supported the For the People Act.

References

External links
 

Political organizations based in the United States
Charities based in Washington, D.C.
501(c)(3) organizations